Mono Vista is a census-designated place (CDP) in Tuolumne County, California, United States. The population was 3,127 at the 2010 census, up from 3,072 at the 2000 census.

Geography
Mono Vista is located at  (38.012087, -120.270701).

Demographics

2010
The 2010 United States Census reported that Mono Vista had a population of 3,127. The racial makeup of Mono Vista was 2,796 (89.4%) White, 6 (0.2%) African American, 58 (1.9%) Native American, 38 (1.2%) Asian, 8 (0.3%) Pacific Islander, 61 (2.0%) from other races, and 160 (5.1%) from two or more races. Hispanic or Latino of any race were 300 persons (9.6%).

The Census reported that 3,102 people (99.2% of the population) lived in households, 25 (0.8%) lived in non-institutionalized group quarters, and 0 (0%) were institutionalized.

There were 1,211 households, out of which 391 (32.3%) had children under the age of 18 living in them, 648 (53.5%) were opposite-sex married couples living together, 129 (10.7%) had a female householder with no husband present, 78 (6.4%) had a male householder with no wife present.  There were 94 (7.8%) unmarried opposite-sex partnerships, and 4 (0.3%) same-sex married couples or partnerships. 272 households (22.5%) were made up of individuals, and 110 (9.1%) had someone living alone who was 65 years of age or older. The average household size was 2.56.  There were 855 families (70.6% of all households); the average family size was 2.98.

The population was spread out, with 731 people (23.4%) under the age of 18, 276 people (8.8%) aged 18 to 24, 728 people (23.3%) aged 25 to 44, 908 people (29.0%) aged 45 to 64, and 484 people (15.5%) who were 65 years of age or older.  The median age was 40.5 years. For every 100 females, there were 99.9 males.  For every 100 females age 18 and over, there were 99.0 males.

The homeowner vacancy rate was 5.3%; the rental vacancy rate was 10.5%.  2,199 people (70.3% of the population) lived in owner-occupied housing units and 903 people (28.9%) lived in rental housing units.

2000
As of the census of 2000, there were 3,072 people, 1,113 households, and 846 families residing in the CDP. The racial makeup of the CDP was 94.08% White, 0.46% African American, 0.78% Native American, 0.42% Asian, 0.10% Pacific Islander, 1.63% from other races, and 2.54% from two or more races. Hispanic or Latino of any race were 7.45% of the population.

There were 1,113 households, out of which 35.8% had children under the age of 18 living with them, 62.6% were married couples living together, 8.6% had a female householder with no husband present, and 23.9% were non-families. 17.5% of all households were made up of individuals, and 7.0% had someone living alone who was 65 years of age or older.  The average household size was 2.74 and the average family size was 3.08.

In the CDP, the population was spread out, with 27.6% under the age of 18, 6.6% from 18 to 24, 25.5% from 25 to 44, 26.4% from 45 to 64, and 14.0% who were 65 years of age or older.  The median age was 39 years. For every 100 females, there were 97.3 males.  For every 100 females age 18 and over, there were 94.7 males.

The median income for a household in the CDP was $42,302, and the median income for a family was $44,419. Males had a median income of $40,104 versus $31,250 for females. The per capita income for the CDP was $19,297.  About 6.1% of families and 8.2% of the population were below the poverty line, including 17.0% of those under age 18 and none of those age 65 or over.

Government

References

Census-designated places in Tuolumne County, California
Census-designated places in California